Macopa may refer to:

Macopa, Telêmaco Borba
Macopa, see Syzygium samarangense